The Allianz Open de Lyon was a golf tournament on the Challenge Tour, played near Lyon, France. It was held annually from 2008 to 2012, and was always held at Golf du Gouverneur in Monthieux.

Winners

See also
Open V33 Grand Lyon

External links

Coverage on the Challenge Tour's official site

Former Challenge Tour events
Defunct golf tournaments in France
Sports competitions in Lyon
Recurring sporting events established in 2008
Recurring sporting events disestablished in 2012

nl:Allianz Open de Lyon